A mono tiltrotor is a kind of tiltrotor.

Mono tiltrotor may refer also to:
 Baldwin Mono Tiltrotor, a development project